Eucosmophora eurychalca is a moth of the family Gracillariidae. It is known from Brazil.

The length of the forewings is 3 mm for males.

References

Acrocercopinae
Moths described in 1920